Kaibobo is an Austronesian language spoken in the Malukus of eastern Indonesia. Kaibobo and Hatusua dialects are distinct.

References

Central Maluku languages
Languages of the Maluku Islands